(1872–1947) was a Japanese physicist and astronomer. He is the father of the astronomer Tadayoshi Murakami (1907–1985). The crater Murakami on the Moon is named after him.

References

 月の命名  

1872 births
1947 deaths
20th-century Japanese astronomers
19th-century Japanese astronomers